Kieran Jon Murphy  is a visually impaired Australian Para tandem cyclist. He won two medals at the 2017 UCI Para-cycling Track World Championships.

Personal
Murphy was born at Modbury Hospital in South Australia to his parents Zoe and Scott Murphy. He has three brothers; Joshua, Liam and Declan. He was  born with a deteriorating eye condition that will one day leave him blind.

Cycling

Murphy initially began his career as a swimmer. Competing at 13 national championships between 2008 and 2014. Four weeks after taking up cycling, he competed at the 2014 National Road and Time Trial Championships. His role model is Kieran Modra who also started as a swimmer and then moved onto cycling.

Murphy with his pilot Lachlan Glasspool won silver medal in the Men's 4 km Individual Pursuit B and bronze medal in the Men's 1 km Time Trial B at the 2017 UCI Para-cycling Track World Championships in Los Angeles, United States

At the 2017 UCI Para-cycling Road World Championships, Pietermaritzburg, South Africa, Murphy and his pilot Lachlan Glasspool finished tenth in the Men's Time Trial B and did not finish in the Men' Road Race B.

In 2017, he is a scholarship holder at the South Australian Sports Institute. He is a member of Mercedes - Benz Adelaide Racing.

References 

Paralympic cyclists of Australia
Paralympic cyclists with a vision impairment
Cyclists with cerebral palsy
Cyclists from South Australia
Living people
Australian male cyclists
1992 births
Australian blind people